Spencer Nead (born November 3, 1977) is a former American football fullback of the National Football League. He was drafted by the New England Patriots in the seventh round of the 2003 NFL Draft. He played college football at Brigham Young.

Nead was also a member of the St. Louis Rams and Atlanta Falcons.

External links
BYU Cougars bio

1977 births
Living people
Players of American football from Tacoma, Washington
American football tight ends
American football fullbacks
BYU Cougars football players
New England Patriots players
St. Louis Rams players
Atlanta Falcons players